Karl Christian Friedrich Pfizer (March 22, 1824 – October 19, 1906), known as Charles Pfizer, was a German-American businessman and chemist who co-founded the Pfizer pharmaceutical company with his cousin, Charles F. Erhart, in 1849, as Chas. Pfizer & Co. Inc.

Life and family 
He was born Karl Christian Friedrich to Karl Frederick Pfizer and Caroline Klotz. Like his older cousin, future business partner and brother-in-law, Karl Erhart, Pfizer was born in Ludwigsburg, Kingdom of Württemberg (now Germany). He emigrated to the United States in October 1848. 

Pfizer married Anna Hausch, in 1859, in his hometown of Ludwigsburg, where he often visited. They had six children, five of whom survived to adulthood: Charles Jr (1860–1928), Gustavus (1861–1944), Emile (1864–1941), Helen Julia (born 1866, who married Sir Frederick Duncan, 2nd Baronet), Alice (who married Baron  of Austria), and Ann (1875–1876). He built a Lutheran Church in New York.

Career 
In 1849, he borrowed US$2,500 from his father to buy a commercial building in Williamsburg, Brooklyn. He then co-founded Chas. Pfizer & Co. Inc. The company produced santonin, an antiparasitic, later expanding production to other chemicals.

Pfizer's partner and cousin, Charles F. Erhart, also wed his sister, Frances, becoming his brother-in-law. When Erhart died, in 1891, their partnership agreement came into effect, which stipulated that the surviving partner could buy the other's share of the company for half of its inventory value. Pfizer promptly exercised this option, paying his partner's heirs $119,350 for Erhart's half of the business. He remained as the head of the company for 51 years, until 1900, when it was incorporated. Charles Pfizer Jr. then became the company's first president; he was later succeeded by his brother, Emile.

1906 injury and death 
Pfizer died at his summer home, "Lindgate", in Newport, Rhode Island; his main residence was in Clinton Hill, Brooklyn. His death followed a fall down stairs, a few weeks prior, in which he broke an arm and was further injured.

References

External links 
Charles Pfizer at Pfizer.com
Stevenson, William. "Charles Pfizer." In Immigrant Entrepreneurship: German-American Business Biographies, 1720 to the Present, vol. 2, edited by William J. Hausman. German Historical Institute.

1824 births
1906 deaths
19th-century German chemists
German emigrants to the United States
American manufacturing businesspeople
Pfizer people
Burials at Green-Wood Cemetery
People from Ludwigsburg
People from the Kingdom of Württemberg
Pharmaceutical company founders
19th-century American businesspeople